Floyd Harrison, better known as Sylk Smoov, is an American rapper from St. Louis, Missouri.

Biography
Harrison was born in north St. Louis. In 1991, performing as Sylk Smoov, he signed a deal with Mercury Records, making him the first rapper from St. Louis to sign with a major record label. His debut album, also called Sylk Smoov, was released on PWL America in 1991. Two singles were released from the album: "Klientele" and "Trick Wit a Good Rap". These peaked at #27 and #14 on Billboards Hot Rap Songs chart, respectively. He subsequently contributed the song "Drop Down" to the soundtrack of the 1994 movie House Party 3. Having traveled to Los Angeles to make his debut album, he subsequently returned to St. Louis to work in the construction industry prior to the release of his second album, Cat Action 25-8, in 2004. The same year, he also performed at SXSW in Austin, Texas, where he opened for Dizzee Rascal.

Critical response
Sylk Smoov was reviewed favorably in the Source, which gave it a rating of 3 out of 5. The review stated that Smoov "...delivers hardcore lyrics in a smooth, mellow style that sounds like a cross between Too Short or MC Breed and Barry White." Robert Christgau was less favorable in his review of the album, which he gave a "neither" rating, corresponding to an album which, according to Christgau, "...may impress once or twice with consistent craft or an arresting track or two. Then it won't."

Discography
Sylk Smoov (PWL America, 1991)
Cat Action 25-8 (Cat Action Music, 2004)

References

Living people
Musicians from St. Louis
Rappers from Missouri
Mercury Records artists
Year of birth missing (living people)